Jake Nava is a British director, mostly known for his work in music videos for Beyoncé, Arctic Monkeys, Adele, Britney Spears and The Rolling Stones. He also directs TV commercials, notably for Guinness and Levi Strauss & Co.

Early life and education 
Nava described himself to Complex magazine as "kind of mixed in race". He was born and bred in North London to a black Mexican father, painter José Nava and an Austrian-Dutch mother. His cousins lived in L.A., and he "felt a genuine bond to that American culture, and I had always loved hip-hop, which, in those days, was American music." He graduated with a degree in film from the University of Westminster.

Career
After college, he began his career directing music videos and films for MTV Sports. Nava has created videos for various artists, including Beyoncé, Arctic Monkeys, Adele, Britney Spears and Rolling Stones. Nava has also directed advertising campaigns for Armani, Puma, Bacardi, and more. In 2013, Nava directed three music videos for Beyoncé’s visual album (“Partition,” “Grown Woman,” and “Flawless”).

In 2014, Nava collaborated with Lana Del Rey on 'Shades of Cool'. In 2015, he directed his first commercial for Guinness, titled 'Intolerant Champion'. In 2016, Nava directed Martini's 'Play With Time', and a second spot for Guinness, titled "We Are Made of Football". In 2017, he directed campaigns for Bacardi, Mastercard, Vauxhall "Pyjama Mamas" for Mother, Levi's "Circles".

Nava continued to collaborate with Beyonce in 2020 on her film Black Is King and in 2021 directed a short film featuring Usher for Rémy Martin called 'Team Up For Excellence'.

References

External links
 
 'Someone Like You' Director Jake Nava's Greatest Hits
 The 30 All-TIME Best Music Videos
 http://www.promonews.tv/2009/09/14/jake-nava-and-marc-webb-win-at-mtv-vmas-kanye-loses-the-plot-again/
 http://www.studiodaily.com/main/searchlist/What-Makes-Music-Videos-Rock_4659.html
 http://www.nypress.com/article-22251-300-d-cup.html
 https://variety.com/2015/film/news/paris-call-girl-romantic-comedy-brett-ratner-1201459431/
 http://www.billboard.com/articles/columns/pop-shop/6738403/lana-del-rey-most-ambitious-music-videos
 José Nava

English music video directors
Alumni of the University of Westminster
Living people
Year of birth missing (living people)
People from Hackney Central
British expatriates in the United States
English people of Mexican descent
English people of Dutch descent
English people of Austrian descent